PRNA may refer to:

 NoRC associated RNA, a non-coding RNA element which regulates ribosomal RNA transcription
 Tryptophan 7-halogenase, an enzyme